ICON is a decentralized, open-source blockchain with smart contract functionality. ICX is the native cryptocurrency of the platform.

History

Founding 
ICON was founded in 2017 by Min Kim of the Switzerland-based ICON Foundation. According to the ICON white paper, the vision for ICON was to introduce a new era of decentralization and hyper connect Korea, Asia.

Launch 
ICON's initial coin offering (ICO) in September 2017 raised 150,000 ETH (approximately US$43 million at the time).

At the time of launch, ICON was supported by various public and private organizations, including the Seoul Metropolitan Government in South Korea, and the Line Corporation in Japan.

ICON 2.0 
In November 2021, ICON 2.0 was launched. Changes included improved performance, Java smart contract support, and preparation for future interoperability via the Blockchain Transmission Protocol (BTP).

Prior to the 2.0 update, Yahoo Finance identified ICON as one of the top-10 interoperability cryptocurrencies.

Design 
ICON is a permission less, non-hierarchical network of computers (nodes) that build on a growing series of "blocks" of transactions, known as a blockchain. Each block contains an identifier of the chain that must precede it if the block is to be considered valid. ICON's consensus mechanism is called Loop Fault Tolerance (LFT), a modified version of the Byzantine Fault Tolerance (BFT) consensus.

The nodes are run by public representatives (P-Reps), with a block being generated approximately every two seconds. ICON was designed to be scalable for both public and private blockchain use cases.

Applications

Decentralized finance 

Decentralized finance (DeFi) is a use case of ICON. It offers traditional financial instruments in a decentralized architecture, outside of companies' and governments' control, such as money market funds which let users earn interest. Decentralized finance applications can be accessed through a Web3-enabled browser extension or application, which allows users to directly interact with the ICON blockchain through a website. Many of these decentralized applications (also known as dapps) can connect and work together to create complex financial services.

Smart contracts 

Smart contracts are a use case of ICON. A smart contract is a computer program or a transaction protocol which is intended to automatically execute, control, or document legally-relevant events and actions, according to the terms of a contract or an agreement. The objectives of smart contracts are the reduction of need in trusted intermediators, arbitrations, and enforcement costs, fraud losses, as well as the reduction of malicious and accidental exceptions.

Non-fungible tokens (NFTs) 

ICON allows for the creation of non-fungible tokens (NFTs). Since tokens of this type are unique, they have been used to represent such things as collectibles, digital art, sports memorabilia, virtual real estate, and items within games. Land, buildings, and avatars in blockchain-based virtual worlds can also be bought and sold as NFTs.

See also 
 List of cryptocurrencies
 Bitcoin
 Decentralized finance

References 

ICON
ICX
ICX
ICX
Cross-platform software